Orbit is a collaborative album by American jazz saxophonist Rob Brown and the Swiss duo composed of pianist Guerino Mazzola and percussionist Heinz Geisser. It was recorded in 1996 and released on the Music & Arts label. Mazzola and Geisser worked together since 1994, before this album they played as a trio of similar instrumentation with Swiss saxophonist  instead of Brown.

Reception
In his review for AllMusic, Scott Yanow states "This is a set that grows in interest with each listen but falls short of being essential despite the obvious talents of the musicians."

Track listing
All compositions by Geisser/Mazzola
 "Boarding" – 4:02
 "Vision One" – 3:59 
 "Vision Two" – 14:36
 "Vision Five" – 3:03
 "Superclusters" – 20:05
 "Bela's Dream" – 7:49
 "Bungy Jump" – 17:30

Personnel
Rob Brown – alto sax, flute
Guerino Mazzola - piano
Heinz Geisser – percussion

References

1997 albums
Rob Brown (saxophonist) albums
Music & Arts albums